Fener Ada (literally "Lighthouse island") is part of the Foça Islands group. It holds one of the beaches in the Aegean Sea.

Islands of Turkey
Gulf of İzmir